Almost Happy is an Argentinian comedy web television series directed by Hernán Guerschuny, written by Sebastián Wainraich and starring Sebastián Wainraich, Natalie Pérez and Santiago Korovsky. The plot revolves around the radio host Sebestián Wainraich and his personal and professional life.

It premiered on Netflix on May 1, 2020. Season 2 was released on April 13, 2022.

Cast
 
 
 Santiago Korovsky
 Hugo Arana
 Adriana Aizemberg

Episodes

Season One

Season Two

Release
Almost Happy was released on 1 May 2020 on Netflix.

References

External links
 
 

Spanish-language Netflix original programming
2020 Argentine television series debuts
2020s Argentine comedy television series